Cecil Gosling (22 February 1910 – 19 May 1974) was an English cricketer. He played for Essex between 1929 and 1930.

References

External links

1910 births
1974 deaths
English cricketers
Essex cricketers
People from Essex
Oxford University cricketers
Alumni of Magdalen College, Oxford